Desencuentro (English: Disagreement) is a Mexican telenovela produced by Ernesto Alonso for Televisa in 1997.

On Monday, November 17, 1997, Canal de las Estrellas started broadcasting Desencuentro weekdays at 8:00pm, replacing Esmeralda. The last episode was broadcast on Friday, April 3, 1998 with Vivo por Elena replacing it the following Monday.

Daniela Castro, Juan Ferrara and Ernesto Laguardia starred as protagonists.

Cast 
 
Daniela Castro as Victoria San Román Jiménez
Juan Ferrara as Andrés Rivera
Ernesto Laguardia as Luis Torres
Juan Peláez as Esteban Aguirre
Alma Muriel as Valentina Quintana de Rivera
María Victoria as Julia
Leticia Perdigón as Chaquira
Luz María Jerez as Sandra Lombardo
Sergio Ramos "El Comanche" as Rufino
Miguel Pizarro as Toni
Juan Manuel Bernal as Sergio Estévez
Emilia Carranza as Inés Altamirano
Eugenio Cobo as Fernando Estévez
María Eugenia Ríos as Queta
Manuel Ojeda as Alfredo San Román Isunza
Guillermo Aguilar as Dr. Álvaro Reyes
Roberto Antúnez as Abel
Dacia Arcaráz as Lolita
Kuno Becker as David Rivera Quintana
Ofelia Guilmáin as Jovita
Lucía Guilmáin as Laura
Bárbara Gómez as Encarnación
Aarón Hernán as Matías
Maty Huitrón as Lidia
Silvia Manríquez as Alma
Paulina Martell as Maru Torres
Maricruz Nájera as Rosario
David Rencoret as Roberto Calderón
Fernando Robles as Manuel
Héctor Sáez as Chiripas
Oscar Traven as José Joaquín
Ana de la Reguera as Beatriz
Leonardo Mackey as Carlos
Elizabeth Arciniega as Marisa
Virginia Gimeno as Aurora
Víctor Lozada as Benito
Alberto Loztin as Samuel
Claudia Ortega as Rosalba
Georgina Pedret as Maricarmen
Thelma Dorantes as Sara
Sylvia Suárez as Hilda
Jacqueline Andere as Herself
Pilar Pellicer as Herself
María Rubio as Herself

Awards and nominations

References

External links

1997 telenovelas
Mexican telenovelas
1997 Mexican television series debuts
1998 Mexican television series endings
Spanish-language telenovelas
Television shows set in Mexico
Televisa telenovelas